Stornubben is a mountain on the border of Vågå Municipality and Lom Municipality in Innlandet county, Norway. The mountain is surrounded by several other notable mountains including Hindnubben to the northeast, Heranoshøi to the north, Glittertinden to the northwest, Nautgardstinden and Nautgardsoksli to the southwest, and Russlirundhøe to the south.

See also
List of mountains of Norway

References

Lom, Norway
Vågå
Mountains of Innlandet